Frederica Henriette of Anhalt-Bernburg (24 January 1702–4 April 1723) was a member of the House of Ascania and Princess of Anhalt-Bernburg by birth and a Princess of Anhalt-Köthen by marriage.

Life 
Frederica Henriette was born in Bernburg, Anhalt, Holy Roman Empire as the fourth daughter and the youngest child of  Charles Frederick, Prince of Anhalt-Bernburg (1668-1721) by his first wife Sophie Albertine of Solms-Sonnenwalde (1672-1708).

In Bernburg on 11 December 1721 she married Leopold, Prince of Anhalt-Köthen and they had one daughter:

Gisela Agnes (b. Köthen, 21 September 1722 - d. Dessau, 20 April 1751), married on 25 May 1737 to Leopold II, Prince of Anhalt-Dessau.

Prince Leopold is famous for being the patron of the composer Johann Sebastian Bach. Unlike her husband, Frederica Henrietta had little interest in music. Moreover, Leopold had to contribute more and more to the Prussian military, leaving him with less money for music. The consequence of all this was the departure of Bach and his family to Leipzig in 1723. Bach blamed Frederica Henriette's lack of interest in music for his having to leave Köthen, although she was dead by the time he took up his post in Leipzig.

Frederica Henrietta suffered from "pulmonary weakness", and died in April 1723 aged 21 and was buried in St. Jakob, Köthen.

References 

1702 births
1723 deaths
House of Ascania
Princesses of Anhalt-Köthen
Daughters of monarchs